"Hips Don't Lie" is a Latin pop and reggaeton song by Colombian singer-songwriter Shakira, featuring Haitian rapper Wyclef Jean, released by Epic Records in 2006 as the second single from Shakira's seventh studio album, Oral Fixation, Vol. 2. Shakira and Jean wrote the lyrics and jointly composed the music with co-writing credit given to Shakira's percussionist Archie Pena. The song was produced by Shakira and Jean with additional co-production by Jerry Duplessis. "Hips Don't Lie" is a reworking of Jean's earlier single "Dance Like This", therefore it features additional composing credits by Omar Alfanno, Duplessis, Luis Días, and LaTavia Parker. The song incorporates samples from "Amores Como el Nuestro" written by Alfanno, and "Carnaval" (Baile la calle) written by Días.

Upon its release, "Hips Don't Lie" received generally favorable reviews from music critics. It received several accolades, including a People's Choice Award, an MTV Latin America Video Music Award, and an MTV Video Music Award. "Hips Don't Lie" became a global success, reaching number one in seventeen countries, including the U.S. Billboard Hot 100, becoming Shakira's first and only number one hit to date in the United States. It also broke the record for the most radio plays in a single week and the fastest-selling digital download song in the United States. The song was eventually certified quadruple platinum by the Recording Industry Association of America (RIAA), where it has sold over 4 million digital copies and 2  million ringtones. It also topped the charts in Australia, France, Germany, Italy, Netherlands, Switzerland, and the United Kingdom, among other countries. The song had amassed an estimated 13 million downloads by 2017, making it one of the best-selling singles of all time.

In 2018, the song was selected as one of the greatest songs by 21st-century women, by National Public Radio, ranked at 65.

Background and release

After attaining international success with her fifth studio effort, Laundry Service, in 2001, Shakira opted to create a two-part follow-up record. Having co-written nearly sixty tracks for Laundry Service, she put herself "on the mission of selecting [her] favorite ones" to record for Oral Fixation, Vol. 2 and its predecessor, the Spanish-language Fijación Oral, Vol. 1. While recording the project, Shakira worked with previous collaborators, and newer partners including Jerry Duplessis and Wyclef Jean.

After the moderate success of "Don't Bother" and of the album, her label Epic Records asked Wyclef Jean, in early 2006, to remake his song "Dance Like This" with Shakira, attempting to revive sales of the album. After that, "Hips Don't Lie" was released as the second single from the album (the first from the reissue) on 28 March 2006. "Hips Don't Lie" debuted on the Los Angeles-based radio station KIIS-FM (on the Ryan Seacrest Morning Show) on 14 February 2006. A Spanish version of the same name was also released. Shakira also sang another version (produced by RedOne) called "Hips Don't Lie/Bamboo" at the closing ceremony of the 2006 FIFA World Cup in Berlin, Germany.

Recording

"Hips Don't Lie" was initially written and recorded by Wyclef Jean, Lauryn Hill and Pras for the Fugees reunion. The song was titled "Lips Don't Lie" at that point, but was never completed due to Hill's dissatisfaction with it. Charlie Walk, who at the time was the President of Epic Records, called Pras to state he wanted to do a remix of the song with Shakira. Following the call, Hill left the group and the Fugee's reunion was over. The song was then given to Shakira and along with Jean and long-time partner Jerry 'Wonder' Duplessis, they produced "Hips Don't Lie". According to another version of events, Jean was asked by Shakira's label to record a remix of "La Tortura" but refused stating he already had a record that Shakira would be perfect for. The record was Jean's own song "Dance Like This", which he recorded with Claudette Ortiz for the Dirty Dancing: Havana Nights soundtrack.

Shakira co-wrote the song with Wyclef Jean, Jerry Duplessis, Omar Alfanno and LaTavia Parker, whilst production was handled by Shakira, Jean and Duplessis. Jean also served as the song's guitarist and programmer alongside Ramón Stagnaro (who also provided guitar), Hermides Benitez, Richard Bravo, Archie Pena and Roberto Cuao who all contributed the song's percussion, whilst Gustavo Celis and Jerry Duplessis added further programming. The song's recording took place at various studios including Hit Factory Criteria, Miami, FL; La Marimonda Studios, Nassau, Bahamas; Olympic Studios, London, England; Platinum Sound Recording Studio, New York, NY; Sonido Azulado, Bogota, Colombia and The Warehouse, Vancouver, British Columbia, Canada.

Composition

"Hips Don't Lie" reimagines Wyclef Jean's 2004 song "Dance Like This" as a Latin pop song with a reggaeton beat. This song, like "Dance Like This" before it, uses a sampled salsa trumpet line from Jerry Rivera's 1992 Omar Alfanno-written song "Amores Como el Nuestro", a song previously sampled on "Deja Vu (Uptown Baby)" by Lord Tariq and Peter Gunz. The use of the opening trumpets caused a small controversy, when Rivera openly accused Shakira of plagiarizing the opening trumpets without his knowing, unaware that rights had already been obtained from his former label Sony Discos.

According to EMI Music Publishing's digital sheet music for the song, "Hips Don't Lie" is set in common time signature, is in the key of B♭ minor, and has a moderate Latin groove of 100 beats per minute. Shakira's vocals span from the low note of A♭3 to the note of B♭4.

During an interview, Shakira explained that the song's lyrics were inspired by her ability to determine the release-readiness of a song by whether or not it motivates her to dance. She states that she used to tell her musicians, "My hips don't lie! Are they moving? They're not moving! So this is not ready."

Commercial performance
Since it has been digitally available in June 2006, the song has sold 4,100,000 downloads, and 685 million streams and two million ringtones in the US alone. The song had at least twice the weekly Hot 100 points of the runner-up title, Ridin' by Chamillionaire featuring Krayzie Bone.

The song debuted at number 84 on the Billboard Hot 100 singles chart in the United States, based on airplay alone. For its 11th week in the chart "Hips Don't Lie" reached number 9 based on heavy airplay rotation in American radios and received the "airplay gainer" title. On the chart issue dated 17 June 2006, "Hips Don't Lie" reached number one on the chart, becoming Shakira's first and to date, only number-one hit in the U.S. and aided by 267,000 digital copies sold in its first week of availability in the digital stores. That sum also marks the biggest opening-week digital sales for a single in 2006, as well as the highest-selling song in its first week for a female artist in 2006. "Hips Don't Lie" spent two consecutive weeks in the chart, and was the 5th most successful song of 2006, the second highest ranked song for a female artist behind Nelly Furtado's "Promiscuous." To date, it is Shakira's most successful single in the United States.

In the UK, it spent a total of five weeks at number one. After its initial one-week reign at number one, it returned to the top in its 8th week preventing Christina Aguilera's "Ain't No Other Man", Rihanna's "Unfaithful", as well as Cascada's "Everytime We Touch" and Chamillionaire's "Ridin' from going to No. 1 until it was replaced by Beyoncé's "Déjà Vu". "Hips Don't Lie" broke the record for the most weeks for a song in a second run, staying four weeks during its second reign at number one, a record it now shares with "Somebody That I Used to Know" by Belgian-Australian singer Gotye. The song remained in the top 10 for 16 weeks and then stayed within the top 75 for an additional 38 weeks. "Hips Don't Lie" finished the 2000s decade as the 11th best selling single by a female artist in the 21st century in the UK, and also the 10th best-selling collaboration. It is also the 46th best-selling single of the 2000 decade in UK.

In Australia, the song debuted at no.1 and remained at the top of the chart for 9 weeks. The song has been certified as six times platinum in the country, becoming one of the best selling 2000s singles. In Ireland, the single remained at the number one spot for a total of nine weeks throughout the summer. "Hips Don't Lie" was the most successful song of 2006 worldwide and it reached No. 1 in the majority of charting countries and territories around the world. It reached number one on the US Billboard Hot 100, Pop 100 and Hot Latin Tracks charts, in Australia, Colombia, the Czech Republic, Flanders, France, Germany, Greece, Hungary, Ireland, Italy, Latin America, Lebanon, the Netherlands, New Zealand, Switzerland and Wallonia.  The song peaked inside the top ten in Austria, Canada (on the Canadian Airplay Chart), Finland, Norway, Denmark and Russia. Furthermore, it reached the 94 position on the Japan International Singles chart. In Sweden, it peaked at number forty-five. "Hips Don't Lie" was the number-two-year-end song in the Netherlands; it also finished number three in Germany and the UK, and in the US it was number five. In Germany, it is the fourth best-selling pop duet ever. It was the best selling song of 2006 in Europe.

Music video

The music video was directed by British director Sophie Muller and filmed in Los Angeles. The video begins with Shakira against a black background dancing while Wyclef and a couple of other men are watching her. When Wyclef raps his first rap verse, it shows him following Shakira with pink curtains everywhere. It also shows them on the street along with different people. When the second verse begins, she is seen sitting in a chair while singing. It then cuts to an arena-like environment, where Shakira is dancing with other people. It ends with Shakira against the black background. The majority of the costumes and outfits featured in the video belong to the Carnaval de Barranquilla, some of which include the white dress Shakira dances in, and the colorful flags.

"Hips Don't Lie" proved successful on LAUNCHcast's top-hundred most-watched videos of the week, where it spent four months at number one. Yahoo! had fans submit videos of themselves dancing to the song, which were edited into a "fans only" version, which has also proved to be one of the most popular videos on LAUNCH. The video for "Hips Don't Lie" ran in the number-one spot on iTunes (along with the single) for several weeks. As of 27 July 2022, it has received over 1.1 billion views on YouTube. The video won the MTV Video Music Award for Best Choreography on 31 August 2006, and the MTV Latin Award for Song of the Year on 19 October 2006. The video also placed at number two on VH1's "Top 40 Videos of 2006".

Live performances
On 9 June 2006, Shakira and Wyclef Jean performed "Hips Don't Lie" at the opening ceremony of the 2006 FIFA World Cup in Munich, and also a month later at the short ceremony preceding the final game in Berlin, to worldwide TV audiences of over 500 million and 700 million people, respectively. On 31 August 2006, it was performed by the duo on the 2006 MTV Video Music Awards. Shakira was given dancing lessons for the performance of the song by Indian choreographer Farah Khan. They also performed the song on the 49th Grammy Awards in 2007.

On 2 February 2020, Shakira performed the song, along with a medley of her other hits, during the Super Bowl LIV halftime show which she headlined with Jennifer Lopez.

Legacy
When it was released in 2006, according to Nielsen Broadcast Data Systems, "Hips Don't Lie" was the most-played pop song in a single week in American radio history. It was played 9,637 times in one week. Shakira became the first artist in the history of the Billboard charts to earn the coveted number one spots on both the Top 40 Mainstream and Latin Chart in the same week doing so with "Hips Don't Lie". Additionally, she is the only artist from South America to reach the number-one spot on the U.S. Billboard Hot 100, the Australian ARIA chart, and the UK Singles Chart.
According to Billboard, "Hips Don't Lie" is one of the 23 most dominant Billboard Hot 100 number ones of the last 30 years, since it occupied the top spot with 2x the points of the weekly No. 2 song on 17 June 2006 chart.
In 2006, fan-made videos directed into one became the second most streamed song on Yahoo only after Shakira's own video of it. Los Angeles Times credits the song for starting a shock wave, and called the action the "Hips Don't Lie Impact" starting a new era of fan-artist interactions. Furthermore, the song became the most streamed video of the year reported by Nielsen Broadcast Data Systems tripling the views of the video in second place, which was Beyoncé's "Check on It".

The song also appeared in the 2016 video game Just Dance 2017.

In 2017, the song ranked 93rd on Billboards Greatest Pop Songs of All Time list.

In 2018, "Hips Don't Lie" was selected as one of the greatest songs by 21st-century women, by National Public Radio, ranking at 65.

In 2021, Time Out New York picked "Hips Don't Lie" as the 11th best pop song of all time.

Track listings
CD single:
 "Hips Don't Lie" (featuring Wyclef Jean) [Jean, Duplessis, Shakira, Parker, Alfanno] – 3:41
 "Dreams for Plans" [Shakira, Buckley] – 4:02
 "Hips Don't Lie" (featuring Wyclef Jean) (Wyclef's Mixshow Mix) – 4:09

Maxi CD single:
 "Hips Don't Lie" (featuring Wyclef Jean) – 3:41
 "Hips Don't Lie" (Wyclef Remix) (featuring Wyclef Jean) – 3:59
 "Hips Don't Lie" (Wyclef Mix Show Mix) (featuring Wyclef Jean) – 4:09
 "Hips Don't Lie" (Wyclef Remix Instrumental) (featuring Wyclef Jean) – 3:57
 "Hips Don't Lie/Bamboo" (2006 FIFA World Cup Version) – 3:24
 "Será Será (Las Caderas No Mienten)" (Spanish version) – 3:35

2-tracks Maxi single:
"Hips Don't Lie"
"Dreams for Plans"

Japanese release:
 "Hips Don't Lie" (featuring Wyclef Jean) – 3:41
 "Hips Don't Lie/Bamboo" (2006 FIFA World Cup Mix) (featuring Wyclef Jean)
 "Será Será (Las Caderas No Mienten)" (Spanish version) (featuring Wyclef Jean) – 3:41
 "Hips Don't Lie" (DJ Kazzanova Remix) (featuring Wyclef Jean)

Ringle:
 "Hips Don't Lie" (featuring Wyclef Jean) – 3:41
 "Hips Don't Lie" (featuring Wyclef Jean) (Wyclef's Show Mix) – 4:09
 "Será Será (Las Caderas No Mienten)" (Spanish Version)[featuring Wyclef Jean] – 3:41

Awards and nominations

"Hips Don't Lie" was a critical success and was nominated for various awards; the American Society of Composers, Authors and Publishers (ASCAP) awarded the song the accolades of Ascap Latin Award – Pop/Ballad Winning Song and Ascap Pop Music Award – Most Performed Songs. At the Billboard Music Awards the song was nominated for three awards; Pop Single of the Year, Top Hot 100 Single and Top Pop 100 Airplay Track. In 2007, the song won at the Best Latin/Reggaeton Track at the International Dance Music Awards.

|-
| rowspan="18"|2006
| rowspan="3" |Billboard Music Awards
| Pop Single of the Year
|
|-
| Top Pop 100 Airplay Track
|
|-
| Top Hot 100 Single
|
|-
| BMI Awards
| BMI Urban Award – Billboard No. 1s
|
|-
| Echo Awards
| Best International Single
|
|-
| Grammy Awards
| Best Pop Collaboration with Vocals
|
|-
| Los Premios MTV Latinoamérica
| Song of the Year
|
|-
| rowspan="3" |Latin Billboard Music Awards
| Hot Latin Song of the Year-Vocal Duet or Collaboration
|
|-
| Latin Pop Airplay Song of the Year – Duo or Group
|
|-
| Hot Latin Songs of the Year
|
|-
| MTV Europe Music Awards
| Best Song
|
|-
| MTV Video Music Awards
| Best Female Video
|
|-
| rowspan="6"|MTV Video Music Awards
| Best Pop Video
|
|-
| Best Dance Video
|
|-
| Video of the Year
|
|-
| Viewer's Choice Awards
|
|-
| Best Choreography in a Video
|
|-
| Best Art Direction in a Video
|
|-
| 2007
| International Dance Music Awards
| Best Latin/Reggaeton Track
|
|-

Charts

Weekly charts

Year-end charts

Decade-end charts

All-time charts

Certifications and sales

|-

Release history

See also
List of Romanian Top 100 number ones of the 2000s
List of best-selling singles in Australia
List of million-selling singles in the United Kingdom
List of best-selling singles of the 2000s (decade) in the United Kingdom

References

Further reading
 

2005 songs
2006 singles
Shakira songs
Wyclef Jean songs
Billboard Hot 100 number-one singles
Number-one singles in Australia
European Hot 100 Singles number-one singles
SNEP Top Singles number-one singles
Number-one singles in Germany
Irish Singles Chart number-one singles
Number-one singles in Italy
Dutch Top 40 number-one singles
Number-one singles in the Netherlands
Number-one singles in New Zealand
Number-one singles in Romania
Number-one singles in Scotland
Number-one singles in Switzerland
Record Report Pop Rock General number-one singles
UK Singles Chart number-one singles
Ultratop 50 Singles (Wallonia) number-one singles
Ultratop 50 Singles (Flanders) number-one singles
Epic Records singles
Sony Music singles
Music videos directed by Sophie Muller
Songs written by Shakira
Songs written by Wyclef Jean
Song recordings produced by Jerry Duplessis
Song recordings produced by Wyclef Jean
FIFA World Cup songs
Reggaeton songs
Songs about dancing
Spanglish songs
Songs involved in plagiarism controversies
Salsa songs
Sampling controversies